There is also a Werner Thomas who is the mayor of Itzgrund, Germany.

Werner Thomas is an accordionist from Davos, Switzerland credited with composing a tune popularly known as the "Chicken Dance" or the "Birdie Song" while working as a restaurant musician during the early 1950s.

External links
 
 HitParade.CH: Werner Thomas 
 Deutsches Musikarchiv: Werner Thomas 

1930s births
Living people
Swiss accordionists
Swiss composers
Swiss male composers
21st-century accordionists
21st-century male musicians